Vibe CT 105.1 FM is a radio station broadcasting from Trinidad and Tobago owned and operated by Guardian Media Limited. The station first started broadcasting on New Years Day, 1 January 1991 as Radio Tempo 105FM but was later rebranded as Vibe CT 105.1, the first Station in T&T to offer an all formatted local music content. The station also touts as being the sports leader as it broadcasts live the majority of the sporting events taking place in the region.

Akhenaton "Ken" Simmons worked at the radio station after years of working at Ebony 104.1 FM.

See also
 Guardian Media Limited
 96WEFM
 The TBC Radio Network
 CNC3
 Trinidad and Tobago Guardian

References

External links
 

Radio stations in Trinidad and Tobago
Radio stations established in 1991